Borota is a village in Bács-Kiskun county, in the Southern Great Plain region of Hungary.

Borota may also refer to:

Places
Borota, Chad, a city in Chad
Borota raid, 2006 attack in Borota

People
Petar Borota (1952 – 2010), Serbian footballer

See also
Borot (disambiguation)
Borut (disambiguation)